The 1967 Middle Tennessee Blue Raiders football team represented Middle Tennessee State University—as a member of the Ohio Valley Conference (OVC) during the 1967 NCAA College Division football season. Led by 21st-year head coach Charles M. Murphy, the Blue Raiders compiled a record an overall record of 5–5 with a mark of 4–3 in conference play, placing third in the OVC. The team's captains were Matheny and Robertson.

Schedule

References

Middle Tennessee
Middle Tennessee Blue Raiders football seasons
Middle Tennessee Blue Raiders football